Paraplectana rajashree is a species of ladybird-mimicking spider described in 2015 from the Western Ghats of Karnataka, India.

References

Araneidae
Spiders described in 2015